The City Hotel in Sonora, California is a former hotel in downtown Sonora at 145 South Washington Street. The building, constructed circa 1852, is associated with Alonzo Green, Sonora's mayor in 1852 and 1853, and James Lane. It includes a sitting room, bar and restaurant with rooms upstairs. It is built of slate, adobe, and red brick, and is one of Sonora's oldest buildings. It belonged to Olivier Bemis in the 1860s. In the early 1900s, the hotel ran a daily horse-pulled-bus service to meet trains. It was listed on the National Register of Historic Places for Tuolumne County, California in 1983.

References

Commercial buildings completed in 1852
Sonora, California
Buildings and structures in Tuolumne County, California
Hotel buildings on the National Register of Historic Places in California
National Register of Historic Places in Tuolumne County, California